Prior to its uniform adoption of proportional representation in 1999, the United Kingdom used first-past-the-post for the European elections in England, Scotland and Wales. The European Parliament constituencies used under that system were smaller than the later regional constituencies and only had one Member of the European Parliament each.

The constituency of Oxfordshire and Buckinghamshire was one of them.

It consisted of the Westminster Parliament constituencies of Aylesbury, Beaconsfield, Buckingham, Chesham and Amersham, Henley, Oxford East, Oxford West and Abingdon, and Wycombe.

MEPs

Election results

References

External links
 David Boothroyd's United Kingdom Election Results 

European Parliament constituencies in England (1979–1999)
Politics of Buckinghamshire
Politics of Oxfordshire
1984 establishments in England
1994 disestablishments in England
Constituencies established in 1984
Constituencies disestablished in 1994